Azam Iqbal (born 2 February 1973 in Chittagong, Bangladesh) is a Bangladeshi cricketer. He has played 35 first-class and 36 List A matches for Chittagong Division in Bangladeshi domestic cricket. Whilst he has not played Test cricket or One Day Internationals for Bangladesh, he did represent them at the 1998 Commonwealth Games.

References
 Cricket Archive profile

1973 births
Living people
Bangladeshi cricketers
Chittagong Division cricketers
Cricketers at the 1998 Commonwealth Games
Commonwealth Games competitors for Bangladesh